The Khutudabiga is a river in Krasnoyarsk Krai, Russia. Its source is in the Byrranga Mountains.

The Khutudabiga freezes up in late September—early October and stays under the ice until June.
Formerly this river was known as Tamara, but its name was changed after the 1917 Russian Revolution.

References

Rivers of Krasnoyarsk Krai
Drainage basins of the Kara Sea